The 2023 NBA All-Star Game was an exhibition game played on February 19, 2023, on the 30th anniversary of the first All-Star Game held in Salt Lake City in 1993. It was the 72nd edition of the event. The game was hosted by the Utah Jazz at Vivint Arena, and was televised nationally by TNT for the 21st consecutive year.

The announcement of the site selection was made on October 23, 2019, at a press conference held by the NBA and the Jazz.

Team Giannis defeated Team LeBron 184–175. It was Team Giannis' first All-Star Game victory, handling Team LeBron's their first loss in such game. Jayson Tatum scored an All-Star Game record 55 points, and was named All-Star Game MVP.

All-Star Game

Coaches

Joe Mazzulla, coach of the Boston Celtics, qualified as the head coach of Team Giannis on January 30. Michael Malone, coach of the Denver Nuggets, qualified as the head coach of Team LeBron on February 1.

Rosters
As had been the case in previous years, the rosters for the All-Star Game were selected through a voting process. The fans could vote through the NBA website as well as through their Google account. The starters were chosen by the fans, media, and current NBA players. Fans made up 50% of the vote, and NBA players and media each comprised 25% of the vote. The two guards and three frontcourt players who received the highest cumulative vote totals in each conferences were named the All-Star starters and two players in each conferences with the highest votes were named team captains. NBA head coaches voted for the reserves for their respective conferences, none of which could be players from their own team. Each coach selected two guards, three frontcourt players and two wild cards, with each selected player ranked in order of preference within each category. If a multi-position player was to be selected, coaches were encouraged to vote for the player at the position that was "most advantageous for the All-Star team", regardless of where the player was listed on the All-Star ballot or the position he was listed in box scores.

The All-Star Game starters were announced on January 26, 2023. Kyrie Irving of Brooklyn Nets (who was traded to the Dallas Mavericks on February 6) and Donovan Mitchell of the Cleveland Cavaliers were announced as of the starting guards for the East, earning their eighth and fourth all-star appearances respectively. Jayson Tatum of the Boston Celtics and Kevin Durant of the Brooklyn Nets (who was traded to the Phoenix Suns on February 8) were named the frontcourt starters in the East, earning their fourth and 13th all-star appearances, respectively. Joining the East frontcourt was Giannis Antetokounmpo of the Milwaukee Bucks, his seventh all-star selection. Durant and Irving's trades to West teams means that only 3 of the 5 East starters will be representing East teams at the time of the ASG.

Additionally, Stephen Curry of the Golden State Warriors and Luka Dončić of the Dallas Mavericks were named to the starting backcourt in the West, earning their ninth and fourth all-star appearances respectively. In the frontcourt, LeBron James of the Los Angeles Lakers earned his 19th all-star appearance, tying Kareem Abdul-Jabbar for most appearances in NBA history. Joining James in the frontcourt were Zion Williamson of the New Orleans Pelicans and Nikola Jokić of the Denver Nuggets, earning their second and fifth all-star appearances, respectively.

The All-Star Game reserves were announced on February 2, 2023. The West reserves included Paul George of the Los Angeles Clippers, his eighth selection; Shai Gilgeous-Alexander of the Oklahoma City Thunder, his first selection; Jaren Jackson Jr. of the Memphis Grizzlies, his first selection; Damian Lillard of the Portland Trail Blazers, his seventh selection; Lauri Markkanen of the Utah Jazz, his first selection; Ja Morant of the Memphis Grizzlies, his second selection; and Domantas Sabonis of the Sacramento Kings, his third selection.

The East reserves included Bam Adebayo of the Miami Heat, his second selection; Jaylen Brown of the Boston Celtics, his second selection; DeMar DeRozan of the Chicago Bulls, his sixth selection; Joel Embiid of the Philadelphia 76ers, his sixth selection; Tyrese Haliburton of the Indiana Pacers, his first selection; Jrue Holiday of the Milwaukee Bucks, his second selection; and Julius Randle of the New York Knicks, his second selection.

After injuries were reported from Stephen Curry, Kevin Durant, and Zion Williamson, the NBA announced that Anthony Edwards of the Minnesota Timberwolves, Pascal Siakam of the Toronto Raptors, and De'Aaron Fox of the Sacramento Kings would replace them as participants in the all-star game. 

 Notes
Italics indicates leading vote-getters per conference.

 Stephen Curry was unable to play due to a leg injury.
 Kevin Durant was unable to play due to a knee injury.
 Zion Williamson was unable to play due to a hamstring injury.
 Pascal Siakam was selected as Kevin Durant's replacement.
 Anthony Edwards was selected as Zion Williamson's replacement.
 De'Aaron Fox was selected as Stephen Curry's replacement.
 Joel Embiid was selected to start in place of Kevin Durant.
 Ja Morant was selected to start in place of Stephen Curry.
 Lauri Markkanen was selected to start in place of Zion Williamson.
 After being announced as an Eastern Conference All-Star, Kyrie Irving was traded from the Brooklyn Nets to the Dallas Mavericks of the Western Conference.
 After being announced as an Eastern Conference All-Star, Kevin Durant was traded from the Brooklyn Nets to the Phoenix Suns of the Western Conference.

Draft
The NBA All-Star draft started at 7:30 p.m. ET (TNT/TBS) on Sunday, Feb. 19. For the first time, the All-Star draft took place right before the game. LeBron James and Giannis Antetokounmpo were named captains as they both received the most votes from the West and East, respectively. Giannis selected the first reserve player and alternated picks until each bench is filled. James had the first selection of the starters as he has had the most votes overall in the balloting process. The first eight players to be drafted will be starters. The next 14 players (seven from each conference) will be chosen by NBA head coaches. NBA Commissioner Adam Silver will select replacements for any player unable to participate in the All-Star Game, choosing a player from the same conference as the player who was being replaced. His selection will join the team that drafted the replaced player. If a replaced player is a starter, the head coach of that team will choose a new starter from their cast of players instead.

Lineups

Game
The 2023 All-Star Game used the same format as the 2020 edition; the team that scores the most points during each of the first three 12-minute quarters will receive a cash prize, which will be donated to a designated charity. The pot will roll over if the teams are tied. The fourth quarter will be untimed, with the first team to meet or exceed a "target score"—the score of the leading team in total scoring after three quarters plus 24—declared the winner. The "target score" in this game was 182, since Team Giannis was leading 158–141 at the end of the third quarter.

Team Giannis defeated Team LeBron 184–175. It was Team Giannis' first win, and Team LeBron's first defeat. It was also the first time in All-Star Game history that the target score was exceeded since the format was changed in 2020. Jayson Tatum, who scored a record-breaking 55 points, was named All-Star Game MVP. His 55 points surpassed Anthony Davis' record of 52 points in 2017. Damian Lillard scored the game-winning 3-pointer to give Team Giannis their first victory in NBA All-Star history.

All-Star Weekend

NBA on TNT American Express Road Show

Celebrity Game

Rising Stars Challenge

Skills Challenge

 Giannis Antetokounmpo was unable to play due to a wrist injury.
 Jrue Holiday  was selected to play instead of Antetokoumnpo.

Three Point Contest

 Anfernee Simons was unable to play due to an ankle injury.
 Julius Randle was selected as Anfernee Simons' replacement.

Slam Dunk Contest

 Shaedon Sharpe withdrew from the competition focusing on the rest of the regular season.
 Jericho Sims was selected as Shaedon Sharpe's replacement.

Notes

References

External links
2023 NBA All Star Game at nba.com

National Basketball Association All-Star Game
Basketball competitions in Salt Lake City
All-Star Game
NBA All-Star Game
NBA All-Star Game